The Guilty is thriller novel written by David Baldacci. It is the fourth installment to feature Will Robie, a highly skilled U.S. Government assassin. The book was released on November 17, 2015 by Grand Central Publishing.

References

External links

2015 American novels
Novels by David Baldacci
Grand Central Publishing books